The fifth IFMAR - 1:10 Electric Off-Road World Championship was held in Basildon in Essex.The 2wd class had a popular win being won by Brian Kinwald from America racing an Associated RC10. Gene Husting of Associated described how the track was deteriorating every day and how team order were implemented for the 3rd final race "Brian's the only one who has a chance to win. He's starting in 6th position. He needs to win this round. If he comes up on you, give him plenty of room to pass. You are, of course, free to race everyone else on the track.". The 4WD was won by Masami Hirosaka of JPN racing a Yokomo there were strong showing for the two home British driver racing Schumacher Cat cars the brand to which Masami won his first title with.

Results

2WD

Race

4WD

Race

References

IFMAR 1:10 Electric Off-Road World Championship
International sports competitions hosted by the United Kingdom